The Sikh Khalsa Army, also known as Khalsaji or simply Sikh Army, was the military force of the Sikh Empire. With its roots in the Khalsa founded by Guru Gobind Singh, the army was later modernised on Franco-British principles by Maharaja Ranjit Singh. It was divided in three wings: the Fauj-i-Khas (elites), Fauj-i-Ain (regular force) and Fauj-i-Be Qawaid (irregulars). Due to the lifelong efforts of the Maharaja and his European officers, it gradually became a prominent fighting force of Asia. Ranjit Singh changed and improved the training and organisation of his army. He reorganized responsibility and set performance standards in logistical efficiency in troop deployment, manoeuvre, and marksmanship. He reformed the staffing to emphasize steady fire over cavalry and guerrilla warfare, improved the equipment and methods of war. The military system of Ranjit Singh combined the best of both old and new ideas. He strengthened the infantry and the artillery. He paid the members of the standing army from treasury, instead of the Mughal method of paying an army with local feudal levies.

Background
Before the reign of Ranjit Singh, the armies in Punjab consisted purely of cavalry. After Ranjit Singh became the Sardar of Sukerchakia Misl he gradually unified most of the Punjab through conquests and diplomacy. However the Afghans, the British and the Gurkhas remained a threat while his empire was in its infancy. Therefore, in 1805, he began recruiting regular forces and employing deserters from the East India Company as officers or soldiers. This latter tactic did not work particularly well because most of the deserters were constantly in touch with the British. The British were alarmed with the rapid conquests of Ranjit Singh and sent many diplomatic missions to help the Phulkian sardars  from a possible conquest of their lands and to check the growing power of the Sikh sovereign. The Sikhs under Maharaja Ranjit Singh had already defeated the British while they first tried to lay claim to Delhi for the first time states Rattan Singh Bhangu.

A Muslim regiment under Charles Metcalfe, 1st Baron Metcalfe was sent to Amritsar for talks with the Maharaja. The soldiers created noise through their chants as they approached Ranjit Singh's fort in Amritsar and passed near the Golden Temple and caused an irregular detachment of Nihang guards to inquire about the disturbances during prayer, before they were challenged by the Muslim soldiers who fired upon them. The Sikh Nihangs shot off many Musket and matchlock volleys rather than a sword charge. It resulted in the death of many of Metcalfe's escorts, while others were wounded. Although more of Metcalfe's soldiers died, Ranjit Singh became particularly fascinated by the Muslim guards. This impressed Ranjit Singh and left a deep impact on him, as the Nihangs had quickly adopted the line formations of Metcalfe's escorts, dominating the entire Muslim battalion. The Maharaja then accepted The Treaty of Amritsar (1809), and saw the British as allies for the moment as he took the British refusal to engage after the assault on Metcalfe's convoy as well as the Sikh army's frequent unanswered incursions and attacks south of the Sutlej on British army officers in Ludhiana as signs of weakness on the British's part.

Modernisation and Formation of Regular Corps 
Throughout 1805, Ranjit Singh recruited many East India Company deserters in his army. The early results were unimpressive. During the visit of Charles Metcalfe, he was shown a band of soldiers, most of them wearing traditional kurtas and colourful turbans, while others wore European infantry ornaments. They had either traditional matchlock or European muskets.

Previously, as the Sikhs refused to join infantry service, Pashtuns, Pakhtuns and Gurkhas served in this sector of the army. However, with the passage of time and owing to Ranjit Singh's efforts, Sikhs too began to join the infantry in large numbers. In 1822 Ranjit Singh employed a veteran of the Napoleonic Wars, General Jean-Baptiste Ventura to train the infantry in European style. In a few years, under his command, the infantry was modernized in French pattern. Similarly, in 1822, Ranjit Singh employed another French Napoleonic War veteran, General Jean-François Allard to modernize the Sikh cavalry. In 1827 Claude Auguste Court was hired to modernize the artillery, and in 1832 Colonel Alexander Gardner was employed to modernize the artillery.

Ranjit Singh wanted to westernise his army thoroughly. However, due to various reasons he could not discard the military system that he had inherited from his forefathers. The military system of the Sikh Empire under Ranjit Singh finally evolved as a compromise between the old and the new ideas. Thus, the military system of the Sikh Empire is termed as a Franco-British system in the Indian subcontinent.

Fauj-i-Ain (Regular Division)

Infantry 
Ranjit Singh was fully aware of the importance of infantry. The task of recruitment in this army had started after 1805, which continued throughout his reign. In the beginning, the number of Sikhs in this army was nominal. The reason being that the Sikhs looked down upon infantry. Therefore, in the beginning, Ranjit Singh recruited some Pathans and Dogras in this section of his army. Afterwards, owing to Ranjit Singh's efforts, Sikhs too began to join it. In 1822, he employed General Jean-Baptiste Ventura to train the infantry in western pattern. Under his guidance, the infantry became the most disciplined army of within a few years.

By 1838-1839 the strength of the infantry had risen to 45,000. It was divided into battalions, companies and sections. Each battalion consisted of 800 soldiers. It was put under a Commandant. Each battalion was divided into eight companies. Each company was put under a Subedar. Each company was divided into 4 sections. Each section consisted of 25 soldiers. It was put under a Jamadar.

Cavalry 
The second most important part of the army was cavalry. In order to organize it on western lines, Ranjit Singh appointed General Jean-Francois Allard. Under his command, the cavalry became very strong. In 1838–39, the overall strength of the cavalry was 10,000. The cavalry was divided into regiments. Each regiment consisted of 250 to 600 cavaliers. The regiments were further divided into risalas (corps). Each Risala consisted of 150 to 250 cavaliers. The officers and other non-combatants of cavalry were similar to those of infantry. The pay of the cavalry was, however, higher than that of the infantry. The men in this division had a sort of helmet-turban with igret feathers coming out from the tip, they clad themselves in yellow Kurtas and grey pajamas.

Artillery 
Ranjit Singh was fully aware of the importance of artillery in the modern warfare. Therefore, he paid a special attention to the development of artillery in 1810. In 1812 he employed General Claude Auguste Court and Colonel Alexander Gardner in 1832 and organized Topkhana-i-Khas. Under their able guidance the artillery made matchless progress in a few years. Maharaja Ranjit Singh divided his artillery into four categories:

 Topkhana-i-Fili: Heavy cannons pulled by elephants
 Topkhana-i-Shutri consisted of those guns which were pulled by camels.
 Topkhana-i-Aspi consisted of light guns pulled by horses
 Topkhana-i-Gavi consisted of medium cannons pulled by oxen

The artillery was divided into batteries or deras. Each battery consisted of 10 guns and 250 gunners. Each battery was under a commandant. The batteries were further divided into sections. Each section compromised 2 guns and 8 to 10 gunners. Each section was under a Jamadar. The entire artillery was under a General. In 1838-39, the strength of the Sikh artillery was 182 heavy cannons, 20 howitzers, and 60 light cannons. It had at least 5,000 gunners.

Fauj-i-Khas (French Division)

Infantry 
The Fauj-i-Khas was the elite wing of the army. It was strictly trained under French pattern and had a separate emblem and flag. It consisted of four infantry battalions, two cavalry regiments and one artillery troop. Its weapons and equipment (including clothing) was of the best kind. The Fauj-i-Khas was supplied with the best available ammunition and they were very loyal to Ranjit Singh, whom they usually escorted. The banner was of a French style and usually had its tricolor with 'Waheguru' inscribed on it. Infantry was clad in scarlet jacket/coat, white trousers with black belts and pouches. Different regiments were distinguished by the colour of their headdress white, red, green or yellow. The Gurkhas had green jackets and black caps. Postins (furcoats), or padded jackets were used during winter. Pathans and Mazhabis were directly sent to this force.

Cavalry 
Cavalrymen were dressed in red jackets (French grey for lancers), long blue trousers with a red stripe, and crimson turbans. Woollen jackets were used during winter. They all instead of the traditional weapons carried only a three foot kirpan and a lance. The regiments were armed with varying combinations of weapons sword/sabres and carbines and matchlocks or lances.

Artillery 
One of the most unique regiments of the Sikh Khalsa Army was the Shutersawaar or the cannon mounted war camel used by Hari Singh Nalwa in his conquest of Peshawar. The Shutersawaar was in the Sher-Dil-Rajman Regiment. Gunners wore white trousers and black waistcoats with crossbelts. Officers were not bound by rules of uniform. They used distinctive dress of bright coloured silks each picking his own as he saw fit.

Fauj-i-Be Qawaid (Irregular Division)

Jagirdari Fauj 
The regular military force was backed up and supported by a further 52,000 well-trained and equipped professional-grade irregulars, known as Fauj-i-Be Qawaid. In addition, a large reservoir of feudal and militia forces was available. Military jagirs were given to the ex-rulers of Misls. They in turn had to give tax to the state or a significant number of soldiers, known as Jagirdar Fauj. It consisted mostly of Cavalry and Infantry. It was the weakest part of the army.

Ghorcharas 
Another part of the Irregular force were the Ghorcharas. Ghorcharas were the relatives of the nobles of the Sikh Empire and the police of the forts. They also refused any type of training and usually taunted the Europeans. The Ghorcharas or the irregular cavalry had no uniform laid down for them; yet they turned out sharply, as testified by Baron Hugel, a Prussian noble, who visited Maharajah Ranjit Singh in 1836 and inspected a cavalry parade. "I never beheld," he wrote of a troop of ghorcharhas, "a finer nor a more remarkably striking body of men. Each one was dressed differently, and yet so much in the same fashion that they all looked in perfect keeping."

Fauj-I-Kilajat 
The Fauj-i-Kilajat was the army defending the forts and also acting as police. Each fort had 50 to 250 of these men and their officer was called Killedar or Thanedar. They were mainly Muslims and wore a traditional white turban with a sky blue overcoat and a yellow kurta.

Misaldars 
Some small Misldars still kept their lands but under the Empire of Maharaja Ranjit Singh. One famous Misldar is Fateh Singh Ahluwalia who fought against the Afghan Forces and did not agree to the Dogra supremacy.

Budha Dal 96 Crori Fauj (Budha Dal Nihang Army) 

Akali Nihangs were not sustained under the Sikh Khalsa army. They were and are a religious army and follow their Jathedar as their king. These jathedars have evolved into the jathedars today. The Akali Nihangs even used to fight with the other armed soldiers of Maharaja Ranjit Singh.  Other parts of the Irregulars consisted of the Akalis, also known as Nihangs. They were devout Sikhs, heavily armed with many traditional weapons and refused European style training. They only wore blue or yellow robes. Their leaders were Akali Phula Singh and Akali Sadhu Singh. Unlike today's Nihang sects and Jathas earlier all Nihangs were in the Budha Dal and ate meat. The Nihangs who hunted boars and deer kept the trophies as 'Soor Das' (Boar's Tooth) and 'Barha Singha' (Deer Horns).

Bunga-wali Nihang 
The Nihang Bana started with a navy or surmayee blue four foot tall Dastar Bunga with many chakrams in ascending order and a Gajgah. On the top of the turban lied a metre and a half long pharla to show that the spirit of the Khalsa would never be broken. Under the dastar Bunga was a Surmayee or navy chola with a yellow hazooria and kamar kasa. Under the Kamar Kasa (a cotton belt) should be two Kirpans, a khanda and other daggers. One Kirpan should be Nagini and one straight. All Nihangs had horses on which there would be a Nishan Sahib, long Musket, a Karpa Barcha and a Nagni Barcha. The Nishan Sahib should be pointed up resembling victory and should have an Ashtabhuja Dhuja on top. This class of Nihangs always came at the Back of the army as they had the tallest turban and held the Nishan Sahib. They were known as the troops of Baba Fateh Singh which inspired the war-cry Fateh Singh Ke Jathe Singh.

Dumala-Wali Nihang 
The Dumala-Wala Nihangs wore a shorter turban with three to four chakrams and a small pharla from it. In the turban lied three to four short Khandas. On the Nihangs back has to be a Dhal with a Vadda Chakram below and on the shoulders was a yellow hazooria. They also carried a Katar tucked in their Kamar-Kasa with two Kirpans, a Khanda, a Jamdhardh and a Toradar Matchlock. They held a Nagni Barcha on their back in a holder. Most of them were cavalry while some were archers and infantry.

Composition

Sikhs formed the bulk of the Sikh Empire's army. The Sikh Army was mainly Punjabi with a predominantly Sikh cadre, but also had a significant multi-religious component made up from other parts of the Punjabi people. There were soldiers of different religious backgrounds (i.e. Muslims and Hindus) and there were soldiers of different tribal backgrounds: Pashtuns, Dogras, Khatris, Jats, Kashyap Rajputs, Ramgarhias, Nepalis and European mercenaries. A promotion to a higher military rank was based on military skill, not hereditary background, so the Sikh Khalsa Army was a classic meritocracy. Enlistment in the army was entirely voluntary, and only strong, physically fit men were recruited. The task of recruiting officers was in the hands of the Generals or the Maharaja himself. Every year, a lot of money was spent on presents and honours for the soldiers who had displayed gallantry. Titles like "Fateh-o Nusrat Nasib", "Zafar Jhang" and "Bright Star of Punjab" were given to many Generals. For disloyalty a soldier could be imprisoned or exiled. Usually, the soldiers were granted two months of leave, either in the winter season or before it. When soldiers were required, leaves were cancelled and they were granted leave at the end of the campaign. The pay of the Sikh Khalsa Army was higher than the pay of the British East India Company and other Asian armies.

Emblems and banners 
The Nishan Sahib Sikh flag flew throughout the empire. The Nihangs had the Blue Flag, while different regiments of the army from different religions were allowed to have banners of their own. The regular regiments of different Sikh sardars had mostly blue-coloured flags and banners. The infantry regiments had flags with depictions of plants and cavalry regiments had depictions of horses on their flags. The Fauj-i-Khas had its own French tricolore flag with Waheguru on it. Most of the Sikh flags had the inscription of the motto of the Khalsa: "Deg Tegh Fateh", in Persian Nastaʿlīq script.

Disbandment 
After the death of Ranjit Singh, the Sikh Empire witnessed the murders of Ranjit Singh's sons, one after another, organised by the Dogras. Then the Dogras urged the army to make the Lahore Durbar declare war on the East India Company. They did so, and the Dogra-led Sikh Army was betrayed by its commanders who revealed battle plans to the British, which allowed them to win several crucial battles. This led to the defeat of the Khalsa and the British signed the Treaty of Lahore, ending the war in a Sikh defeat. The treaty stipulated that the Sikh Empire was to pay a significant amount of reparations to the East India Company, and Jind Kaur, the Sikh regent, was imprisoned and later exiled. The Sikh Army was reduced to 20,000 infantry and 10,000 cavalry. The disbanded soldiers were also furious with the terms of the treaty. This led to the Second Anglo-Sikh War, in which the Sikhs won many battles, but finally lost the Battle of Gujrat. On 10 March 1848 Sikh leaders Chattar Singh Attariwalla and Sher Singh Attariwalla eventually surrendered near Rawalpindi. On 14 March 1849, the Sikh Army surrendered to the East India Company. Many soldiers, while laying their weapons down, started crying and saying "Aj  Ranjit Singh mar Gaya" (literally "Today Ranjit Singh has died"). However, many Sikh Army soldiers entered into service the British Indian Army, where they served with distinction in numerous battles and wars under the British Crown.

Ranks of the Sikh Khalsa Army 

Ranjit Singh encircled himself with an array of generals and soldiers. They were men from different clans, castes and regions.  Some of the ranks come from English, like adjudan (adjutant), kalnal (colonel), jarnail (general)
{| class="wikitable"
! Sikh Khalsa Army rank !! Modern USA/UK/NATO equivalent
|-
|Kumedan or Jarnail|| Major General
|-
|Sardar || Brigadier General
|-
|Adjudan-kumedan || Staff Colonel
|-
|Kalnal || Colonel
|-
| Kalnal-i-Sahni|| Senior lieutenant colonel
|-
|Jamadar Kalnal || Lieutenant Colonel
|-
|Mahzor-i-Sahni || Senior Major
|-
|Mahzor || Major
|-
|Kaptan || Staff Captain
|-
|Subedar || Captain
|-
|Jamadar || First Lieutenant
|-
|Jamadar-i-Sahni || Second Lieutenant
|-
| colspan=2 | Non-commissioned officers
|-
|Adjudan Safis || Chief Warrant Officer
|-
|Adjudan-Seph || Warrant Officer
|-
|Adjudan or Sarjan || Sergeant-Major
|-
|Sarjan Mahzor || First sergeant
|-
|Havildar || Sergeant
|-
|Muttasadi or Phuriya || Company clerk/supply Sergeant
|-
|Naik or Brigadier (Cavalry, Horse Artillery and Gendarmerie) || Corporal
|-
|Sepoy or Sowar (Cavalry) or Topchi(Artillery)|| Private or UK equivalent
|}

Notable generals
Among some of the most important and illustrious names include:

 Hari Singh Nalwa
 General Sardar Gurmukh Singh Lamba
 Mahan Singh Mirpuri
 Gulab Singh Dogra
 Dhian Singh Dogra
 Hira Singh Dogra
 Dewan Mokham Chand
 Gulab Singh Pahuwindia - The Famous General Belonging to the Family Tree of Shaheed Baba Deep Singh Ji of Saheedan Misl
 Akali Phula Singh
 Fateh Singh Ahluwalia
 Jodh Singh Ramgarhia
 Ghaus Mohammad Khan
 Shaikh Elahi Baksh
 Veer Singh later Jallaha of Gurdaspore
 Sawan Mal
 Hukum Singh Chimni
 Diwan Khushal Chand
 Misr Diwan Chand
 Desa Singh Majithia
 Budh Singh Sandhawalia
 Sardar Nihal Singh Attariwalla
 Sardar Sangat Singh Saini
 Mohammed Khan Zufar
 Naziruddin Ilahi
 Sher Singh
 Zorawar Singh
 Chattar Singh Attariwalla
 Balbhadra Kunwar -a Hindu Chhetri (Kshatriya) of the Kunwar family of Gorkha. died at Nowshera leading Khalsa against Afghans. The famous Gorkhali General who served for Ranjit Singh after the Anglo-Nepalese war (1814-1816) and was renowned for his leadership of Battle of Nalapani.
 Dal Singh

Among his European Mercenary Generals were:

 Jean-Baptiste Ventura - Italian (Modena)
 Paolo di Avitabile - Italian (Naples)
 Claude Court - French
 Oms - Spanish
 Honignberger- Romanian
 Hohenzollern- Prussian
 Alexander Gardner
 Josiah Harlan – American general and later governor of Gujrat

See also 
 Fauj-i-Khas
 Misl
 Maharaja Ranjit Singh's Generals
 Sikh Confederacy
 Fauj-i-Ain
 Ranjit Singh
 History of the Punjab
 Akal Sena

References

Maharaja Ranjit Singh, Lord of the Five Rivers, By Jean-Marie Lafont. (Oxford University Press. Date:2002).
History of Panjab,  Dr L. M. Joshi, Dr Fauja Singh.

Sikh Empire
Military history of India
Military units and formations established in 1801
Military in Punjab, Pakistan
Sikhism and violence